Khareha is a small village in Parbat District in Gandaki Province of western Nepal. Khareha is located on the cross side of Pokhara Baglung Highway. It is one of the small wards of Shiwalaya Village Development Committee Kushma Parbat.

Populated places in Parbat District